Yang Li-yin (born 10 January 1963) is a Taiwanese actress. She won the Golden Bell Award for Best Actress in 2006.

Best known for her roles on television, Yang has also appeared in films and on stage.

Selected filmography
Taipei Story (1985)
The Puppetmaster (1993)
Island Etude (2006)
Rookies' Diary (2010–11)
Material Queen (2011)
Inborn Pair (2011–12)
Miss Rose (2012)
Lady Maid Maid (2012–13)
King Flower (2013)
Just You (2013)
Endless Nights in Aurora (2014)
Tie the Knot (2014)
Say Again Yes I Do (2014–15)
Love or Spend (2015–16)
The Love Song (2016)
Love By Design (2016)
Swimming Battle (2016)
A Leg (2020)
The Falls (2021)
Coo-Coo 043 (2022)

References

External links

1963 births
Living people
20th-century Taiwanese actresses
21st-century Taiwanese actresses
Taiwanese film actresses
Taiwanese stage actresses
Taiwanese television actresses